Nelazskoye is a rural locality (a selo) in Nelazskoye Rural Settlement, Cherepovetsky District, Vologda Oblast, Russia. The population was 258 as of 2002. There are 14 streets.

Geography 
Popovka is the nearest rural locality.

References 

Rural localities in Cherepovetsky District